Wiltshire Publications Ltd publishes and prints three local newspapers in west Wiltshire and east Somerset, England: Melksham Independent News (covering Melksham and surrounding villages), White Horse News (covering Westbury and the surrounding villages) and Frome Times (covering Frome). It is a family-owned business and one of the few independent, locally owned newspaper groups in the country.

Operations
Since August 2000, Wiltshire Publications has printed its own newspapers after the purchase of a L&M Pacer/Linonews web offset press. A commercial printing division has been set up, offering commercial printing of newspapers and other publications. As well as newspaper printing, Wiltshire Publications has undertaken commercial printing for a local supermarket group, electoral addresses for political parties and wrapping paper for a fish and chip outlet.

Newspapers
The White Horse News covers Westbury and the surrounding area. , 10,000 copies are distributed every fortnight in Westbury and the surrounding villages – Bratton, Dilton Marsh, Edington, Hawkeridge, Heywood, Westbury Leigh and Erlestoke. It has the largest circulation of any newspaper in the Westbury area, and is the only newspaper delivered to houses in the surrounding villages.

The Frome Times covers the Somerset town of Frome. Over 13,400 copies are distributed fortnightly in the town and it has the largest circulation of any Frome newspaper.

The Melksham Independent News covers Melksham and the surrounding villages. The paper was printed for the first time on 2 April 1981 under the Melksham News title. It was run by Ian and Susan Drew until July 1987 when they sold the business. By 1990, Melksham News had ceased to trade and the Drews decided to return to Wiltshire and resurrect the paper, which was renamed Melksham Independent News. In 1996 and 2011, the newspaper received a Civic Award from Melksham Town Council for services to the community. , 13,700 copies are distributed every fortnight – the largest circulation of any newspaper in the Melksham area.

References

External links 

 Melksham Independent News
 White Horse News
 Frome Times

Mass media in Wiltshire
Newspaper companies of England